Bjørnar Teigen   (born 29 June 1971)  is a Norwegian actor, theater director and playwright.

Teigen studied acting in the Oslo National Academy of the Arts and started working as an actor in Molde's Teatret Vårt after graduation in 1995.

He was awarded The Hedda Award for Debut of the Year for Det tredje tegnet (lit. The Third Sign), a theatre production he wrote and directed for Teatret Vårt in 2003.   The following year he recurred as Lauritz in the sitcom Hos Martin.

In 2006, Teigen was nominated an Amanda Award for Best Actor for his work on the film Import-eksport.

Filmography

Plays
 Det tredje tegnet (2003)
 Blå himmel, grønn skog (2008)
 The Face on Mars

Awards and nominations

References

External links
 

Living people
1971 births
Norwegian male stage actors
Norwegian male film actors
Norwegian male television actors
Norwegian theatre directors
21st-century Norwegian male actors
21st-century Norwegian dramatists and playwrights
21st-century Norwegian male writers
Oslo National Academy of the Arts alumni
Norwegian male dramatists and playwrights